is a railway station on the Chūō Main Line in the city of Chino, Nagano, Japan, operated by East Japan Railway Company (JR East).

Lines
Aoyagi Station is served by the Chūō Main Line, and is 188.0 kilometers from the terminus of the line at Tokyo Station.

Station layout
The station consists of one ground level side platform and one ground level island platform, connected by a footbridge. The station is unattended.

Platforms

History
Aoyagi Station opened on 25 November 1905. With the privatization of Japanese National Railways (JNR) on 1 April 1987, the station came under the control of JR East.

Surrounding area
Former Kanasawa-shuku on the Kōshū Kaidō

See also
 List of railway stations in Japan

References

External links

 JR East Station Information 

Railway stations in Nagano Prefecture
Railway stations in Japan opened in 1905
Stations of East Japan Railway Company
Chūō Main Line
Chino, Nagano